Eddie Byrne (31 January 1911 – 21 August 1981) was an Irish actor.

Career

His stage work included many appearances with Dublin's Abbey Theatre, and also work with the National Theatre in London.

Outside Ireland he is probably best known for his minor role as General Willard in Star Wars (1977) (named after George Lucas's friend and collaborator Willard Huyck), but viewers of horror films might also remember him as the sceptical Inspector Mulrooney in The Mummy (1959) and as the kindly Dr. Reginald Landers in Island of Terror (1966) and the rural inn owner from The Break. He also appeared as Inspector O'Neill in the film Jack the Ripper (1959). He appeared in the TV series 'The Adventures of Robin Hood' (1957), Season 3, Episode 5 as the lord of the manor.

Personal life 

Eddie Byrne was born in Dublin. He was married to Kitty Thuillier and had four children: Frank Byrne, Susan Byrne, Michael Byrne & Catherine Byrne. He died of a stroke in Dublin in 1981.

Filmography

Film
He also appeared in several episodes of "The Saint" with Roger Moore

References

External links

 Eddie Byrne BFI

1911 births
1981 deaths
Irish male stage actors
Irish male film actors
Irish male television actors
Male actors from Dublin (city)
20th-century Irish male actors